Platychora( also known as Platychora ulmi Duval ) is a genus of fungi in the family Venturiaceae. Platychora ulmi is a plant pathogen infecting elms.

References

External links
Platychora at Index Fungorum

Venturiaceae